Saeed Jassim (Arabic:سعيد جاسم) (born 29 September 1998) is an Emirati footballer. He currently plays as a defender.

Career

Al-Ain
Saeed Jassim started his career at Al-Ain and is a product of the Al-Ain's youth system.

Al Dhafra
On Season 2019 left Al-Ain and signed with Al-Dhafra. On 27 October 2019, Saeed Jassim made his professional debut for Al-Dhafra against Al-Wasl in the Pro League, replacing Diego Jardel .

References

External links
 

1998 births
Living people
Emirati footballers
Al Ain FC players
Al Dhafra FC players
UAE Pro League players
Association football defenders
Place of birth missing (living people)